Styx River, a perennial stream of the Macleay River catchment, is located in the Northern Tablelands district of New South Wales, Australia.

Course and features
Styx River rises below Point Lookout in the Snowy Range, a spur of the Great Dividing Range which forms part of the eastern escarpment of the Northern Tablelands, south southeast of Ebor, and flows generally southwest, joined by two minor tributaries before reaching its confluence with the Chandler River, south southwest of Jeogla. The river descends  over its  course; rapidly descending into a deep gorge where it meets the Chandler River.

The Styx goes through part of the Jenolan Caves complex at one point.

See also

 List of rivers of Australia

References

External links
 

Rivers of New South Wales
Northern Tablelands
Armidale Regional Council